"Gonna Take a Lot of River"—often known as "Gonna Take a Lot of River (Mississippi, Monongahela, Ohio)"—is a song written by John Kurhajetz and Mark Henley, and recorded by American country music group the Oak Ridge Boys. It was released in July 1988 as the lead single from the album Monongahela.

In October 1988,  the song ascended to No. 1 on the Billboard magazine Hot Country Singles chart. "Gonna Take a Lot of River" was the first song to feature the lead vocals of group baritone Steve Sanders, who succeeded William Lee Golden in the group's lineup.

In 2011, the group rerecorded the song with a new arrangement and tenor singer Joe Bonsall on lead vocals for their It's Only Natural project at Cracker Barrel Old Country Store. The album included songs originally sung by Sanders. The lineup included Golden on baritone vocals.

Chart positions

Year-end charts

Sources
 Roland, Tom, "The Billboard Book of Number One Country Hits." (Billboard Books, Watson-Guptill Publications, New York, 1991)

References

1988 singles
The Oak Ridge Boys songs
Song recordings produced by Jimmy Bowen
MCA Records singles
1988 songs